Dover is a home rule-class city in Mason County, Kentucky, United States. The population was 316 at the 2000 census. It is part of the Maysville Micropolitan Statistical Area.

Geography
Dover is located at  (38.757993, -83.882536).

History
The town of Dover was laid out by Arthur Fox Jr. in 1818 and possibly named for Dover, England, his father's hometown. A post office was established at Dover in 1833. Dover was incorporated in 1836.

Demographics

As of the census of 2000, there were 316 people, 115 households, and 93 families residing in the city. The racial makeup of the city was 97.15% White, 0.63% African American, 0.32% Native American, and 1.90% from two or more races.

There were 115 households, out of which 35.7% had children under the age of 18 living with them, 62.6% were married couples living together, 15.7% had a female householder with no husband present, and 19.1% were non-families. 16.5% of all households were made up of individuals, and 7.0% had someone living alone who was 65 years of age or older. The average household size was 2.75 and the average family size was 3.00.

In the city the population was spread out, with 29.7% under the age of 18, 8.5% from 18 to 24, 28.5% from 25 to 44, 19.3% from 45 to 64, and 13.9% who were 65 years of age or older. The median age was 35 years. For every 100 females, there were 91.5 males. For every 100 females age 18 and over, there were 103.7 males.

The median income for a household in the city was $33,125, and the median income for a family was $32,250. Males had a median income of $35,208 versus $16,023 for females. The per capita income for the city was $12,187. About 17.7% of families and 19.9% of the population were below the poverty line, including 20.5% of those under age 18 and 7.4% of those age 65 or over.

See also
 List of cities and towns along the Ohio River

References

External links
  Historical Texts and Images of Dover, Kentucky

Cities in Mason County, Kentucky
Kentucky populated places on the Ohio River
Cities in Kentucky
Populated places established in 1818
1818 establishments in Kentucky